Rune Hansen (born 8 October 1949) is a Norwegian footballer who played as a defender. He played in one match for the Norway national football team in 1977. He spent his club career with Vålerenga and Lillestrøm.

References

External links
 

1949 births
Living people
Norwegian footballers
Norway international footballers
Place of birth missing (living people)
Association football defenders
Vålerenga Fotball players
Lillestrøm SK players